Ravenswood, also known as the Leonard Home, is a historic home and farm and national historic district located near Bunceton, Cooper County, Missouri.  It was built in 1880, and is a -story, eclectic Italianate/Second Empire style brick mansion.  It has a low-angle Mansard roof covered with asphalt on top and grey, slate shingles on the slopes. Additions were made to the original house in 1907–1908, 1913 and 1914.  Also on the property are the contributing summer kitchen (1869), the Tally-ho barn, the mule barn, a sheep barn, milk barn, carriage house, Manager's House, servants' houses, smokehouse, sheds, a garage, and a pump house.

It was listed on the National Register of Historic Places in 1975.

References

Historic districts on the National Register of Historic Places in Missouri
Houses on the National Register of Historic Places in Missouri
Italianate architecture in Missouri
Second Empire architecture in Missouri
Houses completed in 1880
Houses in Cooper County, Missouri
National Register of Historic Places in Cooper County, Missouri
1880 establishments in Missouri